The 2022 Miami Hurricanes women's soccer team represented University of Miami during the 2022 NCAA Division I women's soccer season.  The Hurricanes were led by head coach Sarah Barnes, in her fifth season.  They played home games at Cobb Stadium.  This was the team's 24th season playing organized women's college soccer and their 19th playing in the Atlantic Coast Conference.

The Hurricanes finished the season 5–8–3 overall and 2–7–1 in ACC play to finish in twelfth place.  They did not qualify for the ACC Tournament and were not invited to the NCAA Tournament.

Previous season 

The Hurricanes finished the season 4–12–0 overall, and 1–9–0 in ACC play to finish in a tie for twelfth place.  They did not qualify for the ACC Tournament and were not invited to the NCAA Tournament.

Offseason

Departures

Incoming Transfers

Recruiting Class

Source:

Squad

Roster

Team management

Source:

Schedule

Source:

|-
!colspan=6 style=""| Exhibition

|-
!colspan=6 style=""| Non-Conference Regular season

|-
!colspan=6 style=""| ACC Regular season

Rankings

References

Miami
Miami
2021
Miami Hurricanes women's soccer